Damien Dussaut (born 8 November 1994) is a professional footballer who plays as a right back for Romanian Liga I club Rapid București. Born in mainland France, he plays for the Martinique national team.

Club career
Dussaut is a youth exponent from Valenciennes. In 2014, he joined Belgian Pro League side Standard Liège. He made his Belgian Pro League debut at 7 December 2014 in a 0–1 away win against Charleroi.

In January 2019, he signed a contract with Dinamo București. He left Dinamo in July 2019 and two months later he reached an agreement with Viitorul Constanța, signing a contract for three years.

International career
Dussaut was born in mainland France and is of Martiniquais descent. He was called up to the Martinique national team for 2022–23 CONCACAF Nations League matches in June 2022.

Honours
France U20
Toulon Tournament: 2015

References

External links
 
 
 

1994 births
Living people
Sportspeople from Créteil
French people of Martiniquais descent
Association football fullbacks
French footballers
France youth international footballers
Martiniquais footballers
Martinique international footballers
Valenciennes FC players
Championnat National 2 players
Standard Liège players
Sint-Truidense V.V. players
FC Dinamo București players
FC Viitorul Constanța players
FCV Farul Constanța players
FC Rapid București players
Belgian Pro League players
Liga I players
French expatriate footballers
French expatriate sportspeople in Romania
Expatriate footballers in Romania
Footballers from Val-de-Marne